Marjorie Weaver (March 2, 1913 – October 1, 1994) was an American film actress of the 1930s through the early 1950s.

Early life, entrance into acting
Weaver was born in Crossville, Tennessee to John Thomas Weaver and his wife, Ellen (née Martin). Her father was a general freight agent for a railroad in Louisville, Kentucky. She attended the University of Kentucky, and later the Indiana University, with interests in music and won beauty contests at both schools.

Weaver began her acting career as a stage actress in the early 1930s, and also worked as a model during that period, as well as a singer. She received her first film role, uncredited, in 1934. From 1936 through 1945 she received steady acting roles. She began receiving credited roles in larger productions, and starred opposite Ricardo Cortez in the 1937 film The Californian, and that same year she starred opposite Tyrone Power in Second Honeymoon.

Peak years
From 1938 through 1945 she had twenty seven starring roles in films, some of which were B movies. The most notable film role was playing Mary Todd Lincoln in Young Mr. Lincoln (1939), which also starred Henry Fonda and Alice Brady. Some of her more recognizable roles from that seven-year period included a role in the Michael Shayne mystery series opposite Lloyd Nolan, and her role in Charlie Chan's Murder Cruise. In 1945, she starred opposite Robert Lowery in Fashion Model, which was her last role of any consequence. She had four minor roles in 1952, after which she retired from acting.

Later life
On October 22, 1937, in Goshen, Indiana, she married naval officer Kenneth George Schacht. She divorced him in 1941, after having seen each other only 16 days over their four-year marriage. Schacht had been captured by the Japanese, and the Navy had notified her that he was dead.

Partial filmography

 China Clipper (1936) – Secretary
 Here Comes Carter (1936) – Bronson's Secretary (uncredited)
 Polo Joe (1936) – Girl at Polo Field (uncredited)
 Gold Diggers of 1937 (1936) – Chorus Girl (uncredited)
 King of Burlesque (1936)
 On the Avenue (1937) – Chorus Girl (uncredited)
 Melody for Two (1937) – Switchboard Operator (uncredited)
 This Is My Affair (1937) – Miss Blackburn
 The Jones Family in Big Business (1937) – Vicky
 The Californian (1937) – Rosalia Miller
 Hot Water (1937) – Vicki Enfield
 Life Begins in College (1937) – Miss Murphy
 Ali Baba Goes to Town (1937) – Harem Girl (uncredited)
 Second Honeymoon (1937) – Joy
 Sally, Irene and Mary (1938) – Mary Stevens
 Kentucky Moonshine (1938) – Caroline
 Three Blind Mice (1938) – Moira Charters
 I'll Give a Million (1938) – Jean Hofmann
 Hold That Co-ed (1938) – Marjorie
 Young Mr. Lincoln (1939) – Mary Todd
 Chicken Wagon Family (1939) – Cecile Fippany
 The Honeymoon's Over (1939) – Betty Stewart Todd
 The Cisco Kid and the Lady (1939) – Julie Lawson
 Shooting High (1940) – Marjorie Pritchard
 Charlie Chan's Murder Cruise (1940) – Paula Drake
 Maryland (1940) – Georgie Tomlin
 Murder Over New York (1940) – Patricia Shaw
 Michael Shayne, Private Detective (1940) – Phyllis Brighton
 Murder Among Friends (1941) – Mary Lou Packard
 For Beauty's Sake (1941) – Dime Pringle
 Man at Large (1941) – Dallas Davis
 The Man Who Wouldn't Die (1942) – Catherine Wolff
 The Mad Martindales (1942) – Evelyn Martindale
 Just Off Broadway (1942) – Judy Taylor
 Let's Face It (1943) – Jean Blanchard
 You Can't Ration Love (1944) – Marian Douglas
 The Great Alaskan Mystery (1944, Serial) – Ruth Miller
 Pardon My Rhythm (1944) – Dixie Moore
 Shadow of Suspicion (1944) – Claire Winter
 Leave It to Blondie (1945) – Rita Rogers
 Fashion Model (1945) – Peggy Rooney
 We're Not Married! (1952) – Ruthie (uncredited)

References

External links

1913 births
1994 deaths
American film actresses
American stage actresses
University of Kentucky alumni
Indiana University alumni
People from Crossville, Tennessee
Actresses from Tennessee
20th-century American actresses
Actresses from Kentucky